The following is a list of Australia women's national rugby union team international matches.

Overall 
Australia's overall international match record against all nations, updated to 10 May 2022, is as follows:

Full internationals

1990s

2000s

2010s

2020s 
All planned test matches for the Wallaroos in 2020 were cancelled due to impacts of the COVID-19 pandemic, as was the September 2021 tour to New Zealand.

Other matches

References 

Australia women's national rugby union team
Women's rugby union in Australia